Janet Hogan (born 8 April 1945) is an Australian former swimmer. She competed in the women's 200 metre breaststroke at the 1960 Summer Olympics.

References

External links
 

1945 births
Living people
Olympic swimmers of Australia
Swimmers at the 1960 Summer Olympics
Swimmers from Sydney
Australian female breaststroke swimmers